Mark Scharenbroich (born 1953) is an American motivational speaker, humorist, and author.

Early life 
In the 1970s Scharenbroich attended St. Cloud State University in St. Cloud, Minnesota where he earned a degree in mass communications.  While there he toured high schools and colleges with a comedy troupe called Mom’s Apple Pie.

Career 
In 1979, Scharenbroich was hired by Jostens to speak at high schools throughout North America. He was featured in the film The Greatest Days of Your Life …So Far, for which Scharenbroich won the Golden Apple and Silver Screen film awards for writing and performing. He won an Emmy Award as writer/producer for an ABC TV special and is the recipient of several international film awards.

In 1984, he established Scharenbroich & Associates, a communications and production company. Certified by the National Speaker’s Association as a Certified Speaking Professional (CSP), in 2003, Scharenbroich was inducted into the National Speaker’s Association Hall of Fame, receiving the CPAE award — NSA’s Council of Peers Award of Excellence.

Scharenbroich published "Nice Bike: Making Meaningful Connections on the Road of Life" in 2010.  In his book he teaches how to “Nice Bike” someone by acknowledging, honoring, and connecting with them.

Since 2013 Scharenbroich has co-hosted a yearly "Keynote Kamp" with Eric Chester where they instruct other speakers on how to better write and deliver a keynote address.

Publications

Books 
Scharenbroich, Mark (2010). Nice Bike: Making Meaningful Connections on the Road of Life. Minneapolis: Echo Bay Publishing. pp 168 pages.

Films/DVD programs 
 The Greatest Days of Your Life . . . So Far. Minneapolis: Jostens, 1981.
 T is for Teacher. Minneapolis: Jostens, 1983.
 One of a Kind. Minneapolis: Scharenbroich & Associates, 1984.
 Pathways to Performance. Minneapolis: Scharenbroich & Associates, 1986.
 Choose to Lead. Minneapolis: Scharenbroich & Associates, 1987.
 Is this your first? Minneapolis: Scharenbroich & Associates, 1995.
 Building Connections to Improve School Climate. Minneapolis: Scharenbroich & Associates, 2000.
 Building Connections: 100+ Ideas to Improve School Climate. Minneapolis: Scharenbroich & Associates, 2004.
 What’s It About?. Minneapolis: Scharenbroich & Associates, 2005.
 Building Connections to Improve Student Achievement. Minneapolis: Scharenbroich & Associates, 2010.

Awards and honors
 Gold Medal (2011) for Nice Bike, Axiom Business Book Awards
 National Speaker’s Association (2003) Hall of Fame, CPAE
 National Speaker’s Association (2003) Certified Speaking Professional (CSP)
 Silver Screen Award (1982) for The Greatest Days of Your Life…So Far
 National Council on Family Relations (1985), 1st Place for One of A Kind
 Golden Apple Award (1989) for The Greatest Days of Your Life…So Far
 Telly Award (2004) for Building Connections
 Telly Award (2005) for What’s it About? (Writer/Producer)
 Aurora Awards (2004, Gold Award) for What’s it About?
 International Health and Medical Film award (2005) for What’s it About?, and  Building Connections (finalist)
 International Davey Award (2005, Gold Winner – Education) for What’s it About?

References

External links
 The official website of Mark Scharenbroich
 The official website of Nice Bike Honors Veterans
 

People from Minnesota
Living people
1953 births
American male writers
American motivational speakers